Jack Parker Hailman (May 6, 1936 – January 20, 2016) was an American zoologist and ethologist. He taught at the University of Wisconsin–Madison from 1969 to 1998, where he chaired the Department of Zoology from 1989 to 1991. He was executive editor of Animal Behaviour from 1972 to 1978 and served as president of the Animal Behavior Society from 1981 to 1982. In 1998, he received the Animal Behavior Society's Distinguished Animal Behaviorist Award, and in 2014, he received the Bureau of Land Management's National Volunteer Award. He was a fellow of the American Ornithologists' Union, the American Association for the Advancement of Science, the American Society of Naturalists, and the Animal Behavior Society.

References

1936 births
2016 deaths
Scientists from St. Louis
20th-century American zoologists
21st-century American zoologists
Ethologists
Harvard College alumni
Duke University alumni
University System of Maryland faculty
University of Wisconsin–Madison faculty
Fellows of the American Association for the Advancement of Science